Al-Qudayriyya   was a Palestinian Arab village in the Safad Subdistrict. It was depopulated during the 1947–1948 Civil War in Mandatory Palestine on May 4, 1948, by the Haganah and the Palmach's First Battalion of Operation Matate, a sub-operation of Operation Yiftach. It was located 6.5 km south of Safad, situated 1 km east of Wadi al-'Amud.

History
In 1881, the PEF's Survey of Western Palestine  described nearby  Kh. en Nueiriyeh as having "heaps of drafted masonry on the top of terraced hill, with a rock-cut well and three rock-cut wine-presses." According to Khalidi, these were remains of Roman and  Byzantine eras.

British Mandate era
In the 1922 census of Palestine  Qudairiyeh  had a population of 194; all Muslim,  decreasing in the 1931 census to  72, still all  Muslims,  in  a total of 14 houses.

In the 1945 statistics the population was  390 Muslims,  with a total of 12,487 dunams of land, according to an official land and population survey. Of this, 2,029 dunums were used for cereals,  while  10,458 dunams were non-cultivable area.

The village had a shrine for a local sage known as al-Shaykh al-Rumi and the Khirbat al-Nuwayriyya is located in the village.

1948, aftermath
The village was depopulate during  Operation Matateh, on May 4, 1948.

References

Bibliography

 

  
al-Qawuqji, F. (1972): Memoirs  of al-Qawuqji, Fauzi in Journal of Palestine Studies 
"Memoirs, 1948, Part I" in 1, no. 4 (Sum. 72): 27-58., dpf-file, downloadable
"Memoirs, 1948, Part II" in 2, no. 1 (Aut. 72): 3-33., dpf-file, downloadable

External links
Welcome To al-Qudayriyya
al-Qudayriyya, Zochrot
al-Qudayriyya from the Khalil Sakakini Cultural Center
 Al-Qudayriyya, Dr. Khalil Rizk.
Survey of Western Palestine, Map 6: IAA, Wikimedia commons

Arab villages depopulated during the 1948 Arab–Israeli War
District of Safad